Sari Qayeh (also Romanized as Sārī Qayeh and Sārīqayeh) is a village in Gavdul-e Sharqi Rural District, in the Central District of Malekan County, East Azerbaijan Province, Iran. At the 2006 census, its population was 183, in 40 families.

References 

Populated places in Malekan County